Thunder Run is a powered roller coaster, themed after a runaway mine train, found at Canada's Wonderland, in Vaughan, Ontario, Canada. Rather than having a traditional chain lift hill, the train has an electric motor on board. The train (consisting of nine cars of two rows of two seats, plus an extra single row at the front of the train) flies directly into the Wonder Mountain, the artificial mountain that is a trademark of the park. The coaster opened on May 23, 1981, and operated until 1985 as Blauer Enzian, but in 1986 it was relocated, extended, and incorporated into the Wonder Mountain.

The ride occupies the interior of the Wonder Mountain, which was initially supposed to hold a "Bavarian Market". Instead, mechanical equipment was placed inside, which was later relocated to the "roof" of the mountain to make room for the ride. The relocation of mechanical equipment also resulted in the Wonder Mountain walkway to be closed. Riders on Vortex can still see remnants of the look-out terrace before they reach the first drop.

Ride experience

Once the train leaves the station, train riders traverse a left banked-turn, followed by an upward helix to the left inside Wonder Mountain. Part of this helix is exposed, giving train riders a view of the surrounding area. Due to the nature of the train ride, the train picks up speed as it ascends the helix. The train then re-enters the mountain, traversing a downward double-helix to the right in complete darkness, with included special effects. Train riders enter a decorated light tunnel, followed by a downward banked curve to the left. The train passes through the station, then completes the layout a second time before returning to the train station.

While most of the ride is experienced in the dark, riders also encounter visual affects and props, most notably the Dragon (nicknamed "Herman" by Wonderland employees). Other visual effects include lighted tunnels and strobe lights.

As previously mentioned, the train ride is programmed so that it completes two circuits, maximizing the capability of the train coaster's rather small footprints.

In the past, during the park's Halloween Haunt seasonal event in October, Wonderland has renamed the train ride to Haunted Thunder Run with additional light, sound and fog effects.

External links
 
  

Roller coasters introduced in 1981
Roller coasters introduced in 1986
Roller coasters in Ontario
Roller coasters operated by Cedar Fair
Enclosed roller coasters